"On verra bien" is a song performed by French-Israeli singer Amir Haddad. The song was released as a digital download on 2 October 2020 by Parlophone and Warner Music Group as the second single from his fourth studio album Ressources. The song was written by 7 Jaws, Amir Haddad and Freddie Marche.

Critical reception
Jonathan Vautrey from Wiwibloggs said, "The Eurovision 2016 star increases the tempo again compared to the last two singles and delivers a solid French-pop song. 'On verra bien' centres around a theme of perseverance [...] Although the man struggles to begin with, he eventually powers through with the encouragement of his fellow recruits."

Music video
A music video to accompany the release of "On verra bien" was first released onto YouTube on 2 October 2020.

Track listing

Personnel
Credits adapted from Tidal.
 Fred Savio – Producer, composer, keyboards, piano, programming, recorded by
 7 Jwas – Composer, writer
 Amir Haddad – Composer, A&R direction, choir vocals, vocals, writer
 Felipe Saldivia – Composer, bass, drums, guitar
 Freddie Marche – Composer, writer
 Benjamin Marciano – A&R Direction
 David Boukhobza – A&R Direction, executive producer
 Nazim Khaled – A&R Direction, executive producer
 Silvio Lisbonne – A&R Direction, executive producer
 Idan Shneor – Guitar
 Manoli – Guitar
 Chris Gehringer – Masterer
 Yan Memmi – Mixer
 Cynthia Chavan-Letsher – Production Coordinator
 Arnold Ben Saad – Programming
 Ferhat – Violin

Charts

Release history

References

2020 songs
2020 singles
Amir Haddad songs